Virginia's 29th Senate district is one of 40 districts in the Senate of Virginia. It has been represented by Democrat Jeremy McPike since 2016, succeeding retiring fellow Democrat Charles J. Colgan, the longest serving Senator in Virginia history.

Geography
District 29 covers the cities of Manassas and Manassas Park, as well as much of surrounding Prince William County, including some or all of Dale City, Buckhall, Neabsco, and Potomac Mills.

The district overlaps with Virginia's 1st, 10th, and 11th congressional districts, and  the 2nd, 13th, 31st, 50th, 51st, and 52nd districts of the Virginia House of Delegates.

Recent election results

2019

2015

2011

Federal and statewide results in District 29

Historical results
All election results below took place prior to 2011 redistricting, and thus were under different district lines.

2007

2003

1999

1995

References

Virginia Senate districts
Prince William County, Virginia
Manassas Park, Virginia
Manassas, Virginia